The canton of Corbigny is an administrative division of the Nièvre department, central France. Its borders were modified at the French canton reorganisation which came into effect in March 2015. Its seat is in Corbigny.

It consists of the following communes:
 
Anthien
Asnan
Authiou
Bazoches
Beaulieu
Beuvron
Brassy
Brinon-sur-Beuvron
Bussy-la-Pesle
Cervon
Chalaux
Challement
Champallement
Chaumot
Chazeuil
Chevannes-Changy
Chitry-les-Mines
La Collancelle
Corbigny
Corvol-d'Embernard
Dun-les-Places
Empury
Epiry
Gâcogne
Germenay
Grenois
Guipy
Héry
Lormes
Magny-Lormes
Marigny-l'Église
Marigny-sur-Yonne
Mhère
Moraches
Mouron-sur-Yonne
Neuilly
Pazy
Pouques-Lormes
Saint-André-en-Morvan
Saint-Martin-du-Puy
Saint-Révérien
Sardy-lès-Épiry
Taconnay
Vauclaix
Vitry-Laché

References

Cantons of Nièvre